This article is about the demographic features of the population of Mauritania, including population density, ethnicity, education level, health of the populace, economic status, religious affiliations and other aspects of the population.

Population

The proportion of children below the age of 15 in 2010 was 39.9%, 57.4% was between 15 and 65 years of age, while 2.7% was 65 years or older.

Structure of the population

Structure of the population (24.03.2013) (Census, complete tabulation) :

Population by Age Group (Estimates 1.VII.2016):

Vital statistics
Registration of vital events in Mauritania is incomplete. The Population Departement of the United Nations prepared the following estimates.

Fertility and Births
Total Fertility Rate (TFR) (Wanted Fertility Rate) and Crude Birth Rate (CBR):

Fertility data as of 2010 (DHS Program):

Life expectancy

Other demographic statistics 
Demographic statistics according to the World Population Review in 2022.

One birth every 3 minutes	
One death every 16 minutes	
One net migrant every 120 minutes	
Net gain of one person every 4 minutes

The following demographic are from the CIA World Factbook unless otherwise indicated.

Population
4,161,925 (2022 est.)
3,840,429 (July 2018 est.)
3,381,634 (June 2011 est.)

Religions
Muslim (official) 100%

Age structure

0-14 years: 37.56% (male 755,788/female 748,671)
15-24 years: 19.71% (male 387,140/female 402,462)
25-54 years: 33.91% (male 630,693/female 727,518)
55-64 years: 4.9% (male 88,888/female 107,201)
65 years and over: 3.92% (2020 est.) (male 66,407/female 90,707)

0-14 years: 38.24% (male 737,570 /female 730,969)
15-24 years: 19.78% (male 372,070 /female 387,375)
25-54 years: 33.44% (male 595,472 /female 688,620)
55-64 years: 4.74% (male 82,197 /female 99,734)
65 years and over: 3.81% (male 62,072 /female 84,350) (2018 est.)

Median age
total: 21 years. Country comparison to the world: 187th
male: 20.1 years
female: 22 years (2020 est.)

total: 20.7 years. Country comparison to the world: 186th
male: 19.7 years 
female: 21.6 years (2018 est.)

total: 19.3 years
male: 18.5 years
female: 20.2 years (2010 est.)

Birth rate
28.06 births/1,000 population (2022 est.) Country comparison to the world: 37th
29.9 births/1,000 population (2018 est.) Country comparison to the world: 38th

Death rate
7.43 deaths/1,000 population (2022 est.) Country comparison to the world: 109th
7.8 deaths/1,000 population (2018 est.) Country comparison to the world: 97th

Total fertility rate
3.53 children born/woman (2022 est.) Country comparison to the world: 38th
3.79 children born/woman (2018 est.) Country comparison to the world: 39th

Population growth rate
1.99% (2022 est.) Country comparison to the world: 41st
2.14% (2018 est.) Country comparison to the world: 41st
2.349% (2011 est.)

Mother's mean age at first birth
21.4 years (2019-2021)
note: median age at first birth among women 25-29

Contraceptive prevalence rate
17.8% (2015)

Net migration rate
-0.72 migrant(s)/1,000 population (2022 est.) Country comparison to the world: 134th
-0.8 migrant(s)/1,000 population (2017 est.) Country comparison to the world: 132nd

Dependency ratios
total dependency ratio: 76.5 (2015 est.)
youth dependency ratio: 71 (2015 est.)
elderly dependency ratio: 5.5 (2015 est.)
potential support ratio: 18.3 (2015 est.)

Urbanization

urban population: 56.9% of total population (2022)
rate of urbanization: 3.84% annual rate of change (2020-25 est.)

urban population: 53.7% of total population (2018)
rate of urbanization: 4.28% annual rate of change (2015-20 est.)

Life expectancy at birth
total population: 65.22 years. Country comparison to the world: 204th
male: 62.77 years
female: 67.75 years (2022 est.)

total population: 63.8 years (2018 est.)
male: 61.4 years (2018 est.)
female: 66.2 years (2018 est.)

total population: 60.75 years
male: 58.57 years
female: 62.99 years (2010 est.)

Major infectious diseases
degree of risk: very high (2020)
food or waterborne diseases: bacterial and protozoal diarrhea, hepatitis A, and typhoid fever
vectorborne diseases: malaria and dengue fever
animal contact diseases: rabies
respiratory diseases: meningococcal meningitis

note: on 21 March 2022, the US Centers for Disease Control and Prevention (CDC) issued a Travel Alert for polio in Africa; Mauritania is currently considered a high risk to travelers for circulating vaccine-derived polioviruses (cVDPV); vaccine-derived poliovirus (VDPV) is a strain of the weakened poliovirus that was initially included in oral polio vaccine (OPV) and that has changed over time and behaves more like the wild or naturally occurring virus; this means it can be spread more easily to people who are unvaccinated against polio and who come in contact with the stool or respiratory secretions, such as from a sneeze, of an “infected” person who received oral polio vaccine; the CDC recommends that before any international travel, anyone unvaccinated, incompletely vaccinated, or with an unknown polio vaccination status should complete the routine polio vaccine series; before travel to any high-risk destination, CDC recommends that adults who previously completed the full, routine polio vaccine series receive a single, lifetime booster dose of polio vaccine

Sex ratio
at birth: 1.03 male(s)/female
under 15 years: 1.01 male(s)/female
15–64 years: 0.89 male(s)/female
65 years and over: 0.74 male(s)/female
total population: 0.93 male(s)/female (2010 est.)

Ethnic groups
Fair Moors (bidhanes) 53% or 2.4 million people, dark Moors (haratins) 30%, 17% sub-Saharan Mauritanians (non-Arabic speaking, largely resident in or originating from the Senegal River Valley, including Helpulaar, Fulani, Soninke, Wolof, and Bambara ethnic groups)

HIV/AIDS - people living with HIV/AIDS 
9,500 (2003 est.)

HIV/AIDS - deaths:
less than 500 (2003 est.)

Nationality
noun: Mauritanian(s) 
adjective: Mauritanian

Languages
Arabic (official and national), French (widely used in media and among educated classes), Pulaar, Soninke, Wolof, Serer.

Education expenditures
1.9% of GDP (2020) Country comparison to the world: 179th

Literacy
definition: age 15 and over can read and write 
total population: 53.5%
male: 63.7%
female: 43.4% (2017)

total population: 52.1% (2015 est.)
male: 62.6% (2015 est.)
female: 41.6% (2015 est.)

total population: 51.2%
male: 59.5%
female: 43.4% (2000 census)

School life expectancy (primary to tertiary education)
total: 9 years
male: 9 years
female: 10 years (2019)

total: 8 years (2017)
male: 8 years (2017)
female: 8 years (2017)

Unemployment, youth ages 15-24
total: 21.1%
male: 18.8%
female: 24.9% (2017 est.)

References

External links

Maures
Mauritania - Country Profile

 
Society of Mauritania